Serhiy Vasilovich Bebeshko (born 29 February 1968) is a Ukrainian former handball player who competed for the Unified Team in the 1992 Summer Olympics. He won the gold medal with the Unified Team, when he played in all seven matches and scored 19 goals.

The Lieutenant of the Reserves Serhiy Bebeshko was an athlete of the Ukrainian Armed Forces society.

He coached the national team of Ukraine from 2018 to 2021.

References

External links

1968 births
Living people
Ukrainian male handball players
Ukrainian handball coaches
Olympic handball players of the Unified Team
Soviet male handball players
Handball players at the 1992 Summer Olympics
Olympic gold medalists for the Unified Team
Olympic medalists in handball
Medalists at the 1992 Summer Olympics
Handball coaches of international teams
Expatriate handball players
Ukrainian expatriate sportspeople in Spain
Ukrainian expatriate sportspeople in France
Ukrainian expatriate sportspeople in Belarus
Ukrainian expatriate sportspeople in Russia
Liga ASOBAL players
BM Ciudad Real players
People from Nova Kakhovka
Sportspeople from Kherson Oblast